Samuel Singh (born 20 March 1991) is a Nigerian singer and YouTube personality. He is famous for his Bhojpuri cover songs. He got recognition when he uploaded "Lollipop Lagelu" (Bhojpuri Song) cover on his YouTube channel. He graduated from Suresh Gyan Vihar University in Jaipur.

Early life
Samuel was born as Samuel Adepoju in Ogun state in Nigeria. In June 2017, he started by uploading videos on his YouTube channel.

References

1991 births
Living people
21st-century Nigerian male singers
Nigerian YouTubers